The Eighth Commissioner is a 2018 Croatian comedy film directed by Ivan Salaj. It was selected as the Croatian entry for the Best Foreign Language Film at the 91st Academy Awards, but it was not nominated.

Plot
Based on the novel of same name by Renato Baretić, a disgraced politician is sent to a remote Croatian island to coordinate its first valid election. He hopes to succeed where the previous seven commissioners failed.

Cast

 Frano Mašković as Siniša Mesnjak
 Borko Perić as Tonino Smeraldić
 Goran Navojec as Selim
 Filip Šovagović as Brkljačić
 Živko Anočić as Zorzi
 Božidar Smiljanić as Bonino
 Stojan Matavulj as Prime Minister
 Ivo Gregurević as Tonino's Father

See also
 List of submissions to the 91st Academy Awards for Best Foreign Language Film
 List of Croatian submissions for the Academy Award for Best Foreign Language Film

References

External links
 

2018 films
2018 comedy films
Croatian comedy films
2010s Croatian-language films
Films based on Croatian novels
Films set on islands
Films set on fictional islands